The Montgomery Street School, also known as the  Emma Dolfinger School and located at 2500-2506 Montgomery Street, Louisville, Kentucky, is listed on the National Register of Historic Places.

Built in 1852, and once used as a Civil War hospital, it has been a school since 1869. It has since been  expanded and renovated. It was formerly  the Emma Dolfinger School, a public elementary school.  Until 2008, the building was used by Portland Christian School as an elementary school, but Portland Christian has since consolidated the elementary school into its Portland Ave. campus one block to the south.

Today, the building is known as "the Dolfinger", and houses offices and artist studios. This development is part of the efforts of the Portland Investment Initiative.

References

19th-century buildings and structures in Louisville, Kentucky
National Register of Historic Places in Louisville, Kentucky
Defunct schools in Louisville, Kentucky
School buildings on the National Register of Historic Places in Kentucky
1852 establishments in Kentucky
School buildings completed in 1852